F. lutea may refer to:

 Fernandoa lutea, a plant endemic to Tazmania
 Ficus lutea, an African tree
 Filobasidiella lutea, a parasitic fungus
 Fistulinella lutea, a bolete fungus
 Fringilla lutea, an African sparrow
 Fritillaria lutea, a bulbous plant
 Fusceulima lutea, a sea snail